Temnora curtula is a moth of the  family Sphingidae. It is known from forests in Congo, Uganda and western Kenya.

The length of the forewings is 17–21 mm. The upperside of the head, thorax and abdomen is slate-grey, with a blackish-brown medial crest on the head and thorax. The underside of the palps, thorax and base of the abdomen are dirty light brown-fawn and the remainder of the abdomen is hazel-brown, while the edges of segments are more orange with a white dot on each side. The forewing upperside is slate-grey with a brown band running from the middle of the costa to below the middle of the outer margin, shading off proximally to a pale grey space. Distal of the band is a black patch which is somewhat glossy and dentate on the distal edge.

References

Temnora
Moths described in 1908
Moths of Africa